The 2017 NCAA Division III baseball tournament was played at the end of the 2017 NCAA Division III baseball season to determine the 42nd national champion of college baseball at the NCAA Division III level. The tournament concluded with eight teams competing at Neuroscience Group Field at Fox Cities Stadium in Grand Chute, Wisconsin for the championship. Eight regional tournaments were held to determine the participants in the World Series. Regional tournaments were contested in double-elimination format, with four regions consisting of six teams, and four consisting of eight, for a total of 56 teams participating in the tournament.

On Sunday, May 21, the Cal Lutheran Kingsmen advanced to the Division III College World Series for the first time since 1999, with a 9–7 victory over Concordia University Texas. The team historically finished third in 1999 and were the runner-up in 1992 and 1996. The team started strong in the World Series, beating Wheaton College 4–2 and taking 14–5 and 10–8 decisions over North Central College. This meant Cal Lutheran was in the best of three championship series against Washington & Jefferson. The team was led by head coach Marty Slimak for the 24th year. Slimak had played in the DIII College World Series five times before and had helped his team to the national championship game twice.

On May 30, Cal Lutheran won its first baseball championship after defeating the Washington & Jefferson College Presidents 7–3 in the decisive third game at the Neuroscience Group Field at Fox Cities Stadium in Appleton, Wisconsin. CLU had to win twice on Tuesday, May 30, in order to win the championship title. Kingsmen player Miguel Salud of the Philippines was named the SCIAC Most Outstanding Player. He was also an NCAA Division III West All-Region Third-Team pick and a SCIAC second-team pick.

It was Salud's first and only season of collegiate baseball at CLU. As a closer, Salud led Division III in saves with fourteen. He delivered six saves in ten playoff games during postseason play. Salud played a key role in the team winning their first World Series. He appeared in 33 games, second-most for Division III players that season, and went on to earn fourteen saves with a 3–2 record. Cal Lutheran finished with a 40–11 record for the season. Another Kingsmen player, Brad Fullerton, finished with a tournament-best 11 hits to help CLU win the Division III College World Series.

The Kingsmen earned the second Division III national title in the university's history, joining the 2015 women's volleyball team. The 40–11 season was the best in team history and included a 5th straight SCIAC regular season title.

Bids
The 56 competing teams were:

By Team

By conference

Regionals
''Bold indicates winner.

Midwest Regional
Prucha Field at James B. Miller Stadium-Whitewater, WI (Host: University of Wisconsin-Whitewater)

Mideast Regional
Ross Memorial Park-Washington, PA (Host: Washington & Jefferson College)

New York Regional
Onondaga Baseball Complex-Syracuse, NY (Host: State University of New York Athletic Conference)

South Regional
American Legion Field-Danville, VA (Host: Averett University)

New England Regional
Whitehouse Field-Harwich, MA (Host: Massachusetts Maritime Academy)

Central Regional
GCS Ballpark-Sauget, IL (Host: Webster College)

West Regional
Irwin Field-Tyler, TX (Host: University of Texas at Tyler)

Mid-Atlantic Regional
WellSpan Park – York, PA (Host: Middle Atlantic Conferences)

World Series
Neuroscience Group Field at Fox Cities Stadium-Grand Chute, WI (Host: University of Wisconsin-Oshkosh/Lawrence University/Fox Cities Convention and Visitors Bureau)

References

NCAA Division III Baseball Tournament
Tournament
NCAA Division III baseball tournament